Wedding of Silence (Svaďba tišiny) is a 2004 Russian documentary films directed by Pavel Medvedev. It won the Best Documentary Film award at the Karlovy Vary International Film Festival in 2003. It uses Russian Sign Language.

See also

List of films featuring the deaf and hard of hearing

External links
 Wedding of Silence at the Karlovy Vary International Film Festival web site

Russian documentary films
2004 documentary films
Documentary films about deaf people
2004 films
Black-and-white documentary films
Russian Sign Language films
Documentaries about weddings